Philip Maiyo (born January 3, 1982 in Kenya). is a Kenyan international volleyball player.

One of the best players of the Bulgarian Volleyball League and a main weapon of its team in Champions League, he left CSKA Sofia in the summer of 2011 to play for CVM Tomis Constanța. Maiyo was transferred at the request of Martin Stoev.

Personal life
His younger sister, Lydia, is also a volleyball player. She is also an opposite spiker and one of the best players of the Kenyan national team.

References

External links
 Profile at bgvolleyball.com

1982 births
Living people
Kenyan men's volleyball players
Kenyan expatriate sportspeople in Bulgaria
Kenyan expatriate sportspeople in Romania